Steffi Graf was the defending champion but lost in the final 2–6, 6–3, 6–1 against Gabriela Sabatini.

Seeds
A champion seed is indicated in bold text while text in italics indicates the round in which that seed was eliminated. The top eight seeds received a bye to the second round.

  Steffi Graf (final)
  Chris Evert (semifinals)
  Pam Shriver (semifinals)
  Gabriela Sabatini (champion)
  Helena Suková (third round)
  Claudia Kohde-Kilsch (second round)
  Sandra Cecchini (quarterfinals)
  Raffaella Reggi (third round)
  Nathalie Tauziat (third round)
  Catarina Lindqvist (first round)
  Mary Joe Fernández (quarterfinals)
 n/a
  Anne Minter (first round)
  Stephanie Rehe (first round)
 n/a
 n/a

Draw

Finals

Top half

Section 1

Section 2

Bottom half

Section 3

Section 4

References
 1988 Virginia Slims of Florida Draw

Virginia Slims of Florida
1988 WTA Tour